WDMJ (1320 AM) is a news/talk radio station licensed to Marquette, Michigan, with a power output of 5,000 watts during the day and 135 watts at night, covering much of Marquette County, Michigan. It is the oldest continuously operating radio station serving Marquette County. The station is owned by AMC Partners, LLC, doing business as the Radio Results Network and broadcasts from studios on Ridge Street in West Marquette.

History

WDMJ has been broadcasting for several decades and was originally owned by The Mining Journal, Marquette's daily newspaper (with DMJ standing for Daily Mining Journal).  It began broadcasting in 1931 as Marquette's first radio station with the call sign WBEO, later changing to WDMJ.

On May 11, 2020, a fire broke out at the WDMJ transmitter site.The station requested a Special Temporary Authority (STA) from the Federal Communications Commission to use a temporary long wire antenna and to reduce operations to 100 watts. 

WDMJ's programming was simulcast on 1240 WIAN, prior to July 30, 2020, when Sovereign Communications surrendered WIAN's license.

In March of 2022, WDMJ along with WJPD and several stations in Iron Mountain were sold to AMC Media Partners. WDMJ's programming has been re-aligned to feature the same lineup as sister stations WCHT and WMIQ.

References
 
Michiguide.com – WDMJ History

External links

DMJ
Radio stations established in 1931
1931 establishments in Michigan